White Tiger (Ava Ayala) is a fictional superheroine appearing in American comic books published by Marvel Comics. The character was created by Christos Gage and Tom Raney, first appearing in Avengers Academy issue #20 (December 2011). The fifth character to assume the White Tiger mantle, she is the younger sister of Hector Ayala as well as the aunt of Angela del Toro.

Publication history
Ava Ayala first appeared in Avengers Academy issue #20 (December 2011) and was created by Christos Gage. She appeared as a regular character in the series through its final issue, #39 (January 2013). She appeared as a main character in Mighty Avengers starting with issue #1 (September 2013), and then in New Avengers starting with issue #1 (December 2015).

Fictional character biography
Ava, the fifth White Tiger, is the sister of Hector Ayala and a student enrolled in the Avengers Academy. She inherited the White Tiger amulet from her brother, following the death of her family members at the hands of Gideon Mace. Upon her introduction, Ava states the White Tiger is a family legacy that she intends to honor. She also criticizes classmate Reptil for not being more active in the Hispanic community. She has been living with her sister Awilda's family since the death of her parents.

White Tiger joined the Avengers Academy students into fighting the Purifiers.

During the Infinity storyline, White Tiger was seen with Heroes for Hire when they were seen preventing Plunderer's men from stealing robot parts. When the Superior Spider-Man (Doctor Octopus' mind in Spider-Man's body) stops Plunderer and considers the Heroes for Hire team as mercenaries, White Tiger ends up quitting the team. She later joined up with the Mighty Avengers.

During the Inhumanity storyline, White Tiger bonded with Power Man where they discovered that they can combine their abilities to form a White Tiger Chi. This combination was enough to destroy Shuma-Gorath. White Tiger later repaid Power Man by transferring some of her chi into him. This combination event took out Cerberus where Power Man and White Tiger called it their "New York Tiger-Style Kung Fu." Power Man helped White Tiger when she tried to avenge her parents by killing Gideon Mace. The rest of the Mighty Avengers showed up to prevent White Tiger from crossing the line.

During the "Last Days" part of the Secret Wars storyline, White Tiger goes to reconcile with her surviving family members. They are mad that White Tiger has chosen a life that has led to so much death and threaten to kill her if she does not leave.

As part of the All-New, All-Different Marvel event, White Tiger appears as a member of Sunspot's incarnation of the New Avengers.

Ava Ayala later fought with her niece Angela del Toro in Rome. During the fight, the Tiger God from Ava's amulet merged with the Tiger God from  Angela's amulet, which was absorbed into it.

During the New Revengers' attack on the New Avengers at Avengers Base Two, Ava fought Angela again. As the two White Tigers fought, Ava managed to snatch the White Tiger amulet that Maker gave to Angela and destroys it to free Angela from the controls of the merged Tiger Gods and the Hand. They later help the New Avengers defeat the New Revengers and a rogue S.H.I.E.L.D. agent who was hunting A.I.M.

After defeating a rogue A.I.M. group, Ava and Angela discuss about their future, with Ava wondering who the Tiger God will choose to be the next White Tiger.

Powers and abilities
Ava Ayala wears the mystical tiger amulets formerly worn by her brother. When wearing them, her physical strength, speed, stamina, agility, dexterity, reflexes and reactions, coordination, balance, and endurance are enhanced to slightly superhuman levels. She also has razor sharp claws and superhuman martial arts skills.

Other versions
Marvel Universe vs. The Avengers
In the limited series, Marvel Universe vs. The Avengers, Ava Ayala was this version's White Tiger and was one of the remaining four survivors of the Avengers Academy, along with Mettle, Veil, and Striker. While each of them are infected, Ava, along with the remaining Avengers and students wear a Doomstone collar that prevents the virus from taking hold of them fully, while discussing Doctor Doom's motives. After it was revealed that the Doomstones allows the wearer to maintain their humanity while still remain as cannibals, Doom activates the Doomstone, turning it red and allowing the virus to take over. Ava was among those killed while in a fight with the infected Red Hulk and the remaining infected students.

In other media
Television
 The Ava Ayala incarnation of White Tiger appears as a main character in Ultimate Spider-Man, voiced by Caitlyn Taylor Love. This version is a member of S.H.I.E.L.D.'s training program for teenage superheroes along with Spider-Man, Iron Fist, Power Man and Nova. Additionally, she has history with Kraven the Hunter, who killed her grandfather and father, both previous White Tigers, for their familial amulet. Paul Dini, the show's creative consultant stated, "We wanted a young female voice on the team and while she is new, White Tiger proved to be the perfect choice. She's tough and smart, and her cat-like reflexes allow her to match Spider-Man leap for leap in agility. It's important to her that she excels at everything she does, as she plans on leaving the team someday as a full super heroine in her own right".
 An alternate universe version of Ava (voiced by Cree Summer) appears in the episode "Return to the Spider-Verse" [Pt. 1], as a vampire loyal to the Lizard King until Spider-Man, Kid Arachnid, and Blood Spider use a Siege Perilous fragment to cure the villain's victims.

Video games
 Ava Ayala / White Tiger appears in Disney Infinity 2.0 and Disney Infinity 3.0, voiced by Courtnee Draper.
 Ava Ayala / White Tiger appears in Marvel: War of Heroes. 
 Ava Ayala / White Tiger appears as a playable character in Lego Marvel's Avengers, voiced again by Caitlyn Taylor Love.
 Ava Ayala / White Tiger appears as a playable character in Marvel Future Fight.
 Ava Ayala / White Tiger appears in Marvel: Avengers Alliance.
 Ava Ayala / White Tiger appears as a playable character in Lego Marvel Super Heroes 2'', voiced by Skye Bennett.

References

External links
 White Tiger (Ava Ayala) at Marvel Wiki
 White Tiger (Ava Ayala) at Comic Vine

Characters created by Christos Gage
Comics characters introduced in 2011
Latin American superheroes
S.H.I.E.L.D. agents
Avengers (comics) characters
Marvel Comics female superheroes
Marvel Comics martial artists
White Tiger (comics)